My Niece Doesn't Do That is a 1960 Austrian comedy film directed by Franz Josef Gottlieb and starring Cornelia Froboess, Fred Bertelmann, and Margit Nünke.

The film's art direction was by Fritz Jüptner-Jonstorff.

Cast

References

Bibliography

External links 
 

1960 films
1960 musical comedy films
Austrian musical comedy films
1960s German-language films
Films directed by Franz Josef Gottlieb
Constantin Film films